KTBA (AM) is a radio station licensed to serve Tuba City, Arizona, United States. The station is owned by Across Nations. It airs a Native American religious format. 

When it first came on the air in 1981 KTBA was on 1050 kHz. It moved to 760 kHz in 2007.

The station was assigned the KTBA call letters by the Federal Communications Commission.

References

External links
KTBA website
 

TBA
Mass media in Coconino County, Arizona
TBA
Navajo mass media
Hopi